The Fiestas were an American rhythm and blues musical group from Newark, New Jersey, United States.

Organized in 1958, The Fiestas contracted with Old Town Records company in 1959, after the company's owner, Hy Weiss, overheard the group singing in a bathroom adjacent to his office in Harlem. Their debut single was 1959's "So Fine", written by groups guitar player Frank Ingalls, Samuel Ingalls brother; the song was a hit in the U.S., reaching number 3 on the R&B Singles chart and number 11 on the Billboard Hot 100, with "Last Night I Dreamed" on the flip side. A series of soul singles followed from the group, among them "You Could Be My Girlfriend", "Anna", and "Think Smart", but only 1962's "Broken Heart" managed to chart, scoring number 18 on the R&B Singles chart.

Ending their relationship with Old Town, the group later recorded for the Strand and Vigor labels, releasing music into the mid-1970s.

"So Fine" later featured in  the video game, LittleBigPlanet 3.

The group's last television appearance was on the PBS showcase (Rock at 50) recorded May 2003 where they sang "So Fine" at the Benedum Center for the Performing Arts.

Members
Tommy Bullock
Eddie Morris
Sam Ingalls
Preston Lane
Bobby Moore
George Bullock
Randy Stewart
Kenneth Hopper 
Wendell Scott
Wayne Parham

References

External links
The Fiestas biography by J.C. Marion
The Fiestas biography on rockabilly.nl
The Fiestas discography (with group photo) on doo-wop.blogg.org
The Fiestas discography on soulfulkindamusic.net

Musical groups from New Jersey
American rhythm and blues musical groups